for other places called Padornelo, see Padornelo
Padornelo is a village on the Way of St. James in Pedrafita do Cebreiro in the Province of Lugo, Galicia, Spain.

In the Middle Ages Padornelo had a hostel for pilgrims next to the church of St Mary Magdalene, which is no longer extant. A graveyard now occupies the site.

The dedication of the parish church of San Xoan is reminiscent of the Hospitallers (Knights of St John).

References

Bibliography
 Míllan Bravo Lozano, Der Jakobsweg, Editorial Everest S.A.

External links
 Geographical data 
 Population 

Populated places in the Province of Lugo